Rhopobota is a genus of moths belonging to the subfamily Olethreutinae of the family Tortricidae.

Species
Rhopobota amphigonia (Diakonoff, 1968)
Rhopobota ancylimorpha Razowski, 2009
Rhopobota ancyloides Kuznetzov, 1988
Rhopobota antrifera (Meyrick, in Caradja & Meyrick, 1935)
Rhopobota argyrophenga (Diakonoff, 1950)
Rhopobota bicolor Kawabe, 1989
Rhopobota blanditana (Kuznetzov, 1988)
Rhopobota bostrichus Diakonoff, 1983
Rhopobota bucera Zhang, Li & Wang, 2005
Rhopobota cicatrix Razowski, 1999
Rhopobota clivosa (Meyrick, 1912)
Rhopobota cornuta Razowski, 1995
Rhopobota dietziana (Kearfott, 1907)
Rhopobota eclipticodes (Meyrick, in Caradja & Meyrick, 1935)
Rhopobota falcata Nasu, 1999
Rhopobota falcigera (Diakonoff, 1950)
Rhopobota fanjingensis Zhang, Li & Wang, 2005
Rhopobota finitimana (Heinrich, 1923)
Rhopobota floccoa Zhang, Li & Wang, 2005
Rhopobota furcata Zhang, Li & Wang, 2005
Rhopobota grisona Razowski, 2013
Rhopobota grypodes (Meyrick, 1912)
Rhopobota hortaria (Meyrick, 1911)
Rhopobota hypomelas Diakonoff, 1983
Rhopobota ilexi Kuznetzov, 1969
Rhopobota jonesiana Razowski, 2013
Rhopobota kaempferiana (Oku, 1971)
Rhopobota latipennis (Walsingham, 1900)
Rhopobota latisocia Razowski, 2009
Rhopobota leucognoma (Clarke, 1976)
Rhopobota macroceria Razowski, 1999
Rhopobota macrosepalana (Oku, 1971)
Rhopobota metastena Diakonoff, 1984
Rhopobota microceria Razowski, 1999
Rhopobota mou Razowski, 2013
Rhopobota multiplex (Meyrick, 1911)
Rhopobota myrtillana (Humphreys & Westwood, 1845)
Rhopobota nasea Razowski, 2013
Rhopobota naevana (Hübner, [1814-1817])
Rhopobota nova Razowski, 2009
Rhopobota okui Nasu, 2000
Rhopobota orbiculata Zhang, Li & Wang, 2005
Rhopobota punctiferana Kuznetzov, 1988
Rhopobota relicta (Kuznetzov, 1968)
Rhopobota safidana (Razowski, 1963)
Rhopobota scleropa (Meyrick, 1912)
Rhopobota shikokuensis (Oku, 1971)
Rhopobota stagnana ([Denis & Schiffermüller], 1775)
Rhopobota svetlanae Kuznetzov, 2003
Rhopobota symbolias (Meyrick, 1912)
Rhopobota toshimai (Kawabe, 1978)
Rhopobota unidens Razowski, 1999
Rhopobota ustomaculana (Curtis, 1831)
Rhopobota verditer (Hampson, 1891)
Rhopobota visenda (Kuznetzov, 1973)

See also
List of Tortricidae genera

References

External links
Tortricid.net

Eucosmini
Tortricidae genera
Taxa named by Julius Lederer